The 2002 Speedway Conference League was the third tier/division of British speedway.

Summary
The title was won by Peterborough Pumas, the junior club belonging to the Peterborough Panthers.

On 1 May, David Nix was killed after crashing into the fence during the match between Newcastle and King's Lynn at the Norfolk Arena.

Final league table

Conference League Knockout Cup
The 2002 Conference League Knockout Cup was the fifth edition of the Knockout Cup for tier three teams. Buxton Hitmen were the winners.

Quarter-finals

Semi-finals

Final

Other Honours
Conference Trophy - Mildenhall Fen Tigers
Conference League Riders' Championship - James Birkinshaw (Boston)

See also
List of United Kingdom Speedway League Champions

References

Conference
Speedway Conference League